Diss Rugby Club is an English rugby union team based in Diss in  Norfolk. The club runs three senior teams, a veterans side, a ladies team called Diss Vixens  and a full range of junior teams. The first XV plays in London 2 North East - a league at tier 7 of the English rugby union system - following their relegation from London 1 North at the end of the 2018–19 season.

History

Benny Goodman is the 3rd Team Captain

The club was formed in 1958.

Club Honours

1st Team:
Eastern Counties 2 champions: 1993–94
Eastern Counties 1 champions: 1995–96
London 2 North East champions (2): 1996–97, 2016–17
London 2 (north-east v north-west) promotion playoff winners: 2007–08
London Division 2 North champions: 2008–09

2nd Team:
Greene King IPA Eastern Counties 2 North champions: 2014–15

3rd Team
Greene King IPA Eastern Counties 3 North champions: 2016–17

References

External links
Official club website

English rugby union teams
Rugby clubs established in 1958
Rugby union in Norfolk